Avilovsky is a rural locality (a settlement) in Petrov Val, Kamyshinsky District, Volgograd Oblast, Russia. The population was 2 as of 2010.

Geography 
The village is located on the Volga Upland, on the left bank of the Mokraya Olkhovka River, 29 km from Kamyshin, 13 km from Petrov Val and 200 km from Volgograd.

References 

Rural localities in Kamyshinsky District